The United States Marine Corps Birthday is an American holiday celebrated every year on 10 November with a traditional ball and cake-cutting ceremony.  On that day in 1775, the Continental Marines were established.

Historical birthday

The official birthday of the United States Marine Corps is on 10 November 1775. That was the day when the Second Continental Congress established the Continental Marines with the following decree:

When the Revolutionary War ended in 1783, the Continental Navy was disestablished, and with it, the Continental Marines. The Corps was re-established on 11 July 1798, when the act for establishing and organizing a Marine Corps was signed by President John Adams.

Celebration

Prior to 1921, Marines celebrated the recreation of the Corps on 11 July with little pomp or pageantry. On 21 October 1921, Major Edwin North McClellan, in charge of the Corps's fledgling historical section, sent a memorandum to Commandant John A. Lejeune, suggesting the Marines' original birthday of 10 November be declared a Marine Corps holiday to be celebrated throughout the Corps. Lejeune so ordered in Marine Corps Order 47:

The first formal ball was celebrated in 1925, though no records exist that indicate the proceedings of that event. Birthday celebrations would take varied forms, most included dances, though some accounts include mock battles, musical performances, pageants, and sporting events.

The celebrations were formalized and standardized by Commandant Lemuel C. Shepherd, Jr. in 1952, outlining the cake cutting ceremony, which would enter the Marine Drill Manual in 1956. By tradition, the first slice of cake is given to the oldest Marine present, who in turn hands it off to the youngest Marine present, symbolizing the old and experienced Marines passing their knowledge to the new generation of Marines. The celebration also includes a reading of Marine Corps Order 47, republished every year, as well as a message from the current Commandant, and often includes a banquet and dancing if possible. In many cases, the birthday celebration will also include a pageant of current and historical Marine Corps uniforms, as a reminder of the history of the Corps. Another modern tradition includes a unit run on the 10th. Marines are reputed to celebrate the birthday, regardless of where they may be in the world, even in austere environments or combat.

In a more somber tradition, Samuel Nicholas's grave in the Arch Street Friends Meeting graveyard in Philadelphia is marked with a wreath at dawn by a group of Marines annually on 10 November to celebrate his role in the founding of the Corps.

Gallery

See also

 Culture of the United States Marine Corps
 History of the United States Marine Corps

References

External links

Birthday ball, United States Marine Corps
United States Marine Corps in the 18th and 19th centuries
Balls in the United States